Michael Formanek (born May 7, 1958) is an American jazz bassist born in San Francisco, California, United States, and associated with the jazz scene in New York.

Career

In the 1980s, Formanek worked as a sideman with Freddie Hubbard, Joe Henderson, Dave Liebman, Fred Hersch, and Attila Zoller. His debut album as a leader was 1990's Wide Open Spaces, featuring saxophonist Greg Osby, violinist Mark Feldman, guitarist Wayne Krantz, and drummer Jeff Hirshfield. In 1992 he released Extended Animation with the same ensemble, except with Tim Berne replacing Osby on saxophone.

In 1993, Formanek, Berne and Hirshfield recorded as a trio on the album Loose Cannon. Following this, Formanek led the septet of himself, Berne, trumpeter Dave Douglas, reed player Marty Ehrlich, trombonist Kuumba Frank Lacy, drummer Marvin Smith and pianist Salvatore Bonafede. That same year, Formanek began playing with Berne's ensemble, Bloodcount, through the end of the decade, on the albums Lowlife, Poisoned Minds, Memory Select, Discretion, and Saturation Point. His fourth album for Enja Records followed in 1996, with Douglas, trombonist Steve Swell, and drummer Jim Black.

In 1998, Berne and Formanek released Ornery People as a duo, and Formanek issued a solo album, Am I Bothering You?. He toured with Gerry Hemingway that same year. In 1999, Formanek worked in a trio with Ehrlich and Peter Erskine on drums. In 2000, he played in the quartet, Northern Exposure, with Black, Dave Ballou on trumpet, and Henrik Frisk on sax.

Formanek has done extensive work as a session musician, appearing on albums by Jane Ira Bloom, Uri Caine, James Emery, Lee Konitz, Kevin Mahogany, the Mingus Big Band, Scott Fields, the New York Jazz Collective, Daniel Schnyder, and Jack Walrath. Formanek is also a member of Lafayette Gilchrist's trio Inside Out.

Formanek was the director of the Peabody Jazz Orchestra and the jazz bass instructor at the Peabody Conservatory of Music in Baltimore, Maryland, before his amicable departure in 2018.

Discography
 Wide Open Spaces (Enja, 1990)
 Extended Animation (Enja, 1992)
 Loose Cannon (Soul Note, 1993)
 Low Profile (Enja, 1994)
 Nature of the Beast (Enja, 1996)
 Ornery People with Tim Berne (Little Brother, 1998)
 Am I Bothering You? (Screwgun, 1999)
 Relativity (Enja, 1999)
 The Rub and Spare Change (ECM, 2010) with Craig Taborn, Tim Berne and Gerald Cleaver
 Small Places (ECM, 2012) with Craig Taborn, Tim Berne and Gerald Cleaver
 The Distance (ECM, 2016) with Ensemble Kolossus
 Time Like This (Intakt, 2018) with Tony Malaby, Craig Taborn, Ches Smith
 Even Better (Intakt, 2019) with Very Practical Trio 
 Pre-Apocalyptic (Out Of Your Head, 2020)
 Imperfect Measures (Intakt, 2021)
 Were We Where We Were (Circular File Records, 2022) with Drome Trio
With Franco Ambrosetti
Movies (Enja, 1987)
Movies Too (Enja, 1988)
With Tim Berne
 Lowlife: The Paris Concert (JMT, 1995)
 Poisoned Minds: The Paris Concert (JMT, 1995)
 Memory Select: The Paris Concert (JMT, 1995)
 Unwound (Screwgun, 1996)
 Saturation Point (Screwgun, 1997)
 Discretion (Screwgun, 1997)
 Seconds (Screwgun, 2007)
 Insomnia (Clean Feed, 2011)
 Adobe Probe (Screwgun, 2020)
 Attention Spam (Screwgun, 2021)
 5 (Screwgun, 2021)
 Decay (Screwgun, 2022)

With Jane Ira Bloom
 Art and Aviation (Arabesque, 1992)

With Uri Caine
 Urlicht / Primal Light (Winter & Winter, 1997)
 Gustav Mahler in Toblach (Winter & Winter, 1999)
 Gustav Mahler: Dark Flame (Winter & Winter, 2003)

With  and Mary Halvorson as Thumbscrew
2014
 Thumbscrew (Cuneiform, 2014)
 Convallaria (Cuneiform, 2016)
 Theirs (Cuneiform, 2018)
 Ours (Cuneiform, 2018)
 The Anthony Braxton Project (Cuneiform, 2020)

With Tony Malaby
 Sabino (Arabesque, 2000)

With Art Pepper
 San Francisco Samba (Contemporary, 1977)

With Chet Baker
 Burnin' at Backstreet (Fresh Sound)

With Gary Thomas
 Pariah's Pariah (Winter & Winter, 1998)
With Jack Walrath
Serious Hang (Muse, 1992 [1994])

References

External links
 
 
 
 Michael Formanek at Peabody Institute

1958 births
Male double-bassists
American jazz double-bassists
Living people
The Tony Williams Lifetime members
Jazz musicians from San Francisco
21st-century double-bassists
21st-century American male musicians
American male jazz musicians
Intakt Records artists